Jeune-Canada (French for "Young Canada") was a French Canadian right-wing nationalist movement founded in Quebec and active during the 1930s.  Launched in 1932 in reaction to the public nominations of unilingual anglophones, the movement reached its apogee the following year, in 1933.

As a movement, Jeune-Canada was corporatist and ultramontanist; the group advocated for francophone rights in Canada and political and economic autonomy for Quebec. The movement gathered together many of the future elites who would later contribute to the Quiet Revolution, even though the ideals of the Quiet Revolution were quite different from those of Jeune-Canada.

The movement was never officially dissolved; some members still declared themselves as members of Jeune-Canada in 1939.  The files of the organization are maintained by the Lionel Groulx Foundation.

Notable members
Pierre Dansereau, environmentalist, president in 1932
Philippe Ferland, journalist and politician
Gérard Filion, journalist, president from 1936 to 1938
Lucien L'Allier, father of the Montreal Metro 
André Laurendeau, journalist, president from 1933 to 1935
Dostaler O'Leary, journalist
Claude Robillard, urban planner

Supporters of the movement
Le Devoir
Édouard Montpetit, economist
Esdras Minville, writer
Lionel Groulx, historian
Pierre Trudeau, journalist and politician

External links
Several documents on the Jeune-Canada movement
Jeune-Canada at the Canadian Encyclopedia

Political history of Quebec
Quebec nationalism